Crime in Norway is countered by Norway's law enforcement agencies.

Norway has one of the lowest crime rates in the world and has seen a significant decline in crime in recent years. There was a 4.3 percent decrease from 2015 to 2016, and a decline of as much as 9.6 percent from 2014. If population growth is factored in, the level of reported offences is by far the lowest in the 24 years of these statistics.

Crime by type

Murder 

In 2018, Norway had a murder rate of 0.53 per 100,000 population. There were a total of 25 murders in Norway in 2018.

According to a comparison of crime statistics from Norwegian Kripos and Swedish BRÅ done by Norwegian daily newspaper Aftenposten, the murder rate of Norway has since 2002 been roughly half that of neighbour country Sweden.

Sexual violence 

In 2018, 2,564 cases of rape were reported to the police.

Domestic violence 

According to Norwegian police statistics, 5,284 cases of domestic violence were reported in 2008. These cases ranged from serious acts of violence such as murder and attempted murder to physical assault. The number of reported cases of domestic violence increased by 500 percent from 2005 to 2011.

Organized crime

Organized crime operates on a small scale. Drug trafficking, petty theft, and home burglary rings typify organized crime, which is often associated within immigrant youth communities or transiting criminal rings from outside of Norway.

The Hells Angels Motorcycle Gang has been involved in weapons and drugs offences in Norway. Norwegian bikers also took part in the  Great Nordic Biker War.

Crime by location

Oslo 

According to the Oslo Police, they receive more than 15,000 reports of petty thefts annually. The rate is more than seven times the number per-capita of Berlin. Approximately 0.8% of those cases get solved. In the first 6 months of 2014, the number of petty thefts has declined by approximately 30%.

Oslo has witnessed annual spikes in sexual assault cases in years leading up to 2012.

Crime dynamics 
A large proportion of the crime that is carried out in Norway is committed by Norwegians while 34 percent of the Norwegian prison population are foreigners.

The overall probability that a person living in Norway would be convicted for a felony was increased by about 0.5 percentage points for the immigrant compared to non-immigrant populations for felonies committed in the years 2001–2004. The incidence was especially high among immigrants from Kosovo, Morocco, Somalia, Iraq, Iran and Chile, and reached more than 2% in all these groups. In comparison, the incidence in the non-immigrant population was about 0.7%. Incidence was lower than for the non-immigrant population among immigrants from among others, Western European countries, Eastern Europe except Poland, the Balkans and Russia, the Philippines, China and North America. Incidence was also higher for persons with two immigrant parents for all countries of origin, including Nordic and Western European countries. When the data was corrected for the population group's age and gender structure (the most over-represented immigrant groups also have a considerable over-representation of young men), place of residence (rural–central) and employment situation, the over-representation was found to be significantly lower, especially for those groups which had the highest incidence in the uncorrected statistics. For some groups, among them immigrants from Bosnia-Herzegovina, Poland, Russia and the other Eastern European countries, the corrected incidences did not differ significantly from the non-immigrant population.

In 2017, a Statistics Norway report on crime in Norway was ordered by the immigration minister Sylvi Listhaug. According to Statistics Norway, since there is a generally low proportion of crime across all resident populations, it limited the scope of the paper to figures for individual nations from which at least 4,000 immigrants lived in Norway as of January 1, 2010. In the 2010–2013 period, the proportion of foreign-born perpetrators of criminal offences aged 15 and older per 1000 residents in Norway was found to be highest among immigrants from South and Central America (164.0), Africa (153.8), and Asia including Turkey (117.4), and lowest among immigrants from Eastern Europe (98.4), other Nordic countries (69.1), and Western Europe outside the Nordic region (50.7). This was compared to averages of 44.9 among native Norwegians and 112.9 among Norway-born residents with parents of foreign origin. Among individual countries of origin for which figures were provided, the estimated proportion of foreign-born perpetrators was highest among immigrants from Kosovo (131.48), Afghanistan (127.62), Iraq (125.29), Somalia (123.81), and Iran (108.60). Over-representation largely depended on variables such as gender and age structure (M2) and employment (M4), with residence (M3) having a negligible effect on the total. When adjusted for these variables, the unadjusted proportion (M1) of the foreign-born perpetrators of criminal offences during the same period dropped significantly in the adjusted estimates: Kosovo (113 M2; 106 M4), Afghanistan (93 M2; 85 M4), Iraq (102 M2; 92 M4), Somalia (102 M2; 89 M4), and Iran (98 M2; 91 M4). Immigrants from Poland were the only over-represented population for which all three adjustable variables, including residence, could explain their over-representation.

According to Statistics Norway, as of 2015, a total of 260,868 persons residing in Norway incurred sanctions. Of these, most were citizens of countries in Europe (240,497 individuals), followed by Asia (2,899 individuals), Africa (2,469 individuals), the Americas (909 individuals), and Oceania (92 individuals). There were also 13,853 persons sanctioned who had unknown citizenship, and 149 persons sanctioned without citizenship. The five most common countries of origin of foreign citizens in Norway who incurred sanctions were Poland (7,952 individuals), Lithuania (4,227 individuals), Sweden (3,490 individuals), Romania (1,953 individuals) and Denmark (1,728 individuals).

Drugs
The Norwegian drug market is stable, with cannabis most commonly used and seized by law enforcement agencies, while amphetamines, MDMA, and other synthetic psychoactive substances and narcotic pharmaceuticals decrease in importance. There has been a sharp drop in heroin use. Cocaine remains more significant.

In 2022, the Supreme Court found that drug addicts should be allowed to possess drugs without punishment. Subsequently, the Attorney General announced that possession of less than 5 grams of heorin, cocaine and amphetamine would not be pursued by the police or prosecution.

Prevention

Policing

Norway has 188 police officers per 100,000 people.

Research
Several research organisations conduct research of different aspects of crime and crime prevention. In 2004, the Government established the Norwegian Centre for Violence and Traumatic Stress Studies with the national responsibility for violence research in Norway, including sexual and domestic violence.

See also 
 Human trafficking in Norway
 Incarceration in Norway
 Norwegian Police Service

References